Solo Monk (1965) is the fifth studio album Thelonious Monk recorded for Columbia Records, and his eighth overall for that label. The album is composed entirely of solo piano work by Monk. The Allmusic review by Thom Jurek states "This is perhaps the solo piano record to have by Monk". In addition to various vinyl and CD issues, Sony Music Enterprises issued an SACD (SRGS 4520) in Japan.

Track listing
All compositions by Thelonious Monk except as indicated
Side One
"Dinah" [take 2] (Akst, Lewis, Young) – 2:27
"I Surrender, Dear" (Barris, Clifford) – 3:43
"Sweet and Lovely" [take 2] (Arnheim, LeMare, Tobias) – 2:58
"North of the Sunset" – 1:50
"Ruby, My Dear" [take 3] – 5:35
"I'm Confessin' (That I Love You)" (Daugherty, Neiburg, Reynolds) – 2:36
Side two
"I Hadn't Anyone Till You" (Noble) – 3:17
"Everything Happens to Me" [take 3] (Adair, Dennis) – 3:25
"Monk's Point" – 2:11
"I Should Care" (Cahn, Stordahl, Weston) – 1:56
"Ask Me Now" [take 2] – 4:35
"These Foolish Things (Remind Me of You)" (Link, Marvell, Strachey) – 3:32
CD Bonus Tracks
"Introspection" – 2:14 
"Darn That Dream" (DeLange, Van Heusen) – 3:41 
"Dinah" (Akst, Lewis, Young) – 2:25 
"Sweet and Lovely" (Arnheim, LeMare, Tobias) – 3:18
"Ruby, My Dear" – 4:48 
"I'm Confessin' (That I Love You)" (Daugherty, Neiburg, Reynolds) – 2:44 
"I Hadn't Anyone Till You" (Noble) – 3:21 
"Everything Happens to Me" (Adair, Dennis) – 5:20 
"Ask Me Now" – 3:43

Personnel
Thelonious Monk – piano

References

Thelonious Monk albums
Albums produced by Teo Macero
Columbia Records albums
Solo piano jazz albums